Perth Glory Football Club is an Australian professional soccer club based in Perth, Western Australia. It competes in the country's premier women's competition, A-League Women. The team was established in 2008, with the founding of the new league.

History

Establishment

After Australia reached the quarter-finals of the 2007 FIFA Women's World Cup for the first time, head coach Tom Sermanni felt the establishment of a professional league was vital for continuing the development of players. Perth Glory was one of eight teams included in the establishment of the league the following year by Football Federation Australia.

Ownership and team management

Perth Glory is owned by Tony Sage.

During the team's inaugural season, the women's team was managed by Nicola Williams who improved to be a top–four performing side in the second half of the season. In 2010, Jamie Harnwell was named head coach and led the team to second and first place finishes and a first-time trip to the finals. In July 2015, former A-League striker Bobby Despotovski was named head coach with former Matilda and Perth Glory captain Collette McCallum as assistant coach. After five years as a coach, Despotovski stepped down in November 2020 and was replaced by Alexander Epakis a few weeks later.

Players

Current squad

Season-by-season record

Honours

Domestic
W-League
Winners (1): 2014
Runners-up (2): 2012–13, 2016–17
W-League Grand Finals
Runners-up (3): 2014, 2017, 2019

See also
 List of top-division football clubs in AFC countries
 Women's soccer in Australia
 W-League records and statistics
 Australia women's national soccer team

References

External links
Perth Glory official website 
W-League official website
Football Federation Australia official website

 
Perth Glory FC
A-League Women teams
Women's soccer clubs in Australia
2008 establishments in Australia

Perth Glory